Lucio D'Ambra (1880–1939) was an Italian writer and film director. Born as Renato Manganella, he wrote under the pen name of D'Ambra becoming a celebrated journalist, novelist, and film critic. A noted film enthusiast, D'Ambra became involved in the cinema in 1911 when he anonymously wrote screenplays. From 1916 he formally entered the film industry, setting up his own production company and directing more than twenty films. His silent comedies drew comparisons to the films of his German contemporary Ernst Lubitsch. In 1922 D'Ambra's company was absorbed into the conglomerate Unione Cinematografica Italiana and he retired from regular filmmaking although he occasionally produced further screenplays. In 1937 he published his memoirs, recounting his time working in Italy's early film industry.

Selected filmography

Director
 The Illustrious Actress Cicala Formica (1920)

Screenwriter
 Il bacio di Cirano (1913)
 The Thirteenth Man (1917)
 Nemesis (1920)
 On with the Motley (1920)
 Take Care of Amelia (1925)
 Giuseppe Verdi (1938)
 First Love (1941)

References

Bibliography
 Marrone, Gaetana. Encyclopedia of Italian Literary Studies: A-J. Taylor & Francis,

External links 
 
 

1880 births
1939 deaths
Italian male journalists
20th-century Italian screenwriters
Italian film producers
Italian film directors
Writers from Rome
Italian male screenwriters
20th-century Italian journalists
20th-century Italian male writers